James Arthur Raye Jr. (born March 26, 1946) is an American football coach and former player who is currently a senior adviser to NFL vice-president Troy Vincent. A book about his college career by award-winning sportswriter Tom Shanahan was published in September 2014 by August Publications titled Raye of Light: Jimmy Raye, Duffy Daugherty, the Integration of College Football and the 1965–66 Michigan State Spartans. Tony Dungy, who considers Raye a mentor, wrote the foreword.

Playing career
Raye attended the segregated E. E. Smith High School in Fayetteville, North Carolina.

In college, as a quarterback, Raye was the backup for the Michigan State Spartans football team that played in the 1966 Rose Bowl, and he started for the 1966 Spartans in the famous 10–10 tie with Notre Dame, a game often referred to as "The Game of the Century." He was the South's first black quarterback to win a national title, on the 1966 Michigan State team. (The first black quarterback to win a national title was Minnesota's Sandy Stephens, from Uniontown, Pennsylvania, in 1960.) Raye and College Football Hall of Famers Bubba Smith (from Texas), George Webster (South Carolina) and Gene Washington (Texas) arrived at Michigan State from the segregated South as part of head coach Duffy Daugherty's Underground Railroad.

Raye was drafted by the Los Angeles Rams for the position of cornerback but was quickly traded to the Philadelphia Eagles.

Coaching career
Raye began his coaching career in 1971 at his alma mater, Michigan State, where he stayed for five years (1971–75).  He served a brief stint at Wyoming in 1976 and Texas in 1977 before moving to the NFL ranks in 1977.

He coached in the NFL for a total of 36 years with 10 different teams, serving as offensive coordinator for 13 seasons: 1983–84 with the Los Angeles Rams, 1985–86 with the Tampa Bay Buccaneers, 1990 with the New England Patriots, 1998–2000 with the Kansas City Chiefs, 2001 with the Washington Redskins, 2004–05 with the Oakland Raiders (where he was also assistant head coach), and 2009–10 with the San Francisco 49ers.

Following the 2009 49ers season, Raye was praised for his ability to adapt the offense after key players were injured, and he continued as the 49ers' offensive coordinator to start the 2010 season. This was the first time in seven years that the 49ers had an offensive coordinator return to the team for consecutive seasons.  But Raye was fired after the 49ers lost their first three games of 2010.

Personal life
His son, Jimmy Raye III, is currently Senior Personnel Executive for the Detroit Lions.

References

1946 births
Living people
American football cornerbacks
American football quarterbacks
Detroit Lions coaches
Kansas City Chiefs coaches
Los Angeles Rams coaches
Los Angeles Rams players
Michigan State Spartans football coaches
Michigan State Spartans football players
National Football League offensive coordinators
New England Patriots coaches
New York Jets coaches
Oakland Raiders coaches
Philadelphia Eagles players
San Francisco 49ers coaches
Tampa Bay Buccaneers coaches
Washington Redskins coaches
Wyoming Cowboys football coaches
Sportspeople from Fayetteville, North Carolina
African-American coaches of American football
African-American players of American football
21st-century African-American people
20th-century African-American sportspeople